Intec College is a distance education centre located in South Africa.
They are associated with the International Correspondence School, founded in the United States in 1896. The Cape Town branch was founded in 1906, which is the branch associated with Intec College.

Intec college offers 300+ courses.  They are divided into schools, including the Business School, Technical Studies, Vocational School, and others. They claim more than 120,000 active students, and have students ranging in age from 14 to 90.

Ranking

Sources 
 Official Site

External links
Educor's official site
Damelin's Official Site
Intec College
Intech College
Damelin Correspondence College Official Site

Distance education institutions based in South Africa